Odd Gulbrandsen (born 11 March 1953) is a Norwegian former footballer who played as a winger. Gulbrandsen played in 12 1. Divisjon matches for Rosenborg. He also played against Standard Liège in the 1970–71 European Cup.

Odd's daughter Ragnhild Gulbrandsen also became a professional footballer and represented the Norway women's national football team.

References 

1953 births
Living people
Norwegian footballers
Rosenborg BK players

Association football midfielders